Frenchboro is a town in Hancock County, Maine, United States, and a village within this town located on Long Island, southeast of Swans Island. The population was 29 at the 2020 census. The town is accessible by state ferry service from Bass Harbor.

Geography

Twelve islands in the Gulf of Maine comprise the town:
Black Island
Crow Island
Duck Islands (2: Little and Great)
Drum Island
Green Islands (2)
Harbor Island
 Long Island
Mount Desert Light
Placentia Island
Pond Island

Demographics

2010 census
As of the census of 2010, there were 61 people, 21 households, and 16 families living in the town. The racial makeup of the town was 86.9% White, 3.3% Native American, and 9.8% from two or more races.

There were 21 households, of which 47.6% had children under the age of 18 living with them, 57.1% were married couples living together, 14.3% had a female householder with no husband present, 4.8% had a male householder with no wife present, and 23.8% were non-families. 19.0% of all households were made up of individuals, and 19.1% had someone living alone who was 65 years of age or older. The average household size was 2.90 and the average family size was 3.25.

The median age in the town was 27.2 years. 36.1% of residents were under the age of 18; 6.6% were between the ages of 18 and 24; 29.5% were from 25 to 44; 14.7% were from 45 to 64; and 13.1% were 65 years of age or older. The gender makeup of the town was 62.3% male and 37.7% female.

2000 census
As of the census of 2000, there were 38 people, 18 households, and 12 families living in the town. The population density was 7.9 people per square mile (3.1/km2). There were 59 housing units at an average density of 12.3 per square mile (4.7/km2). The racial makeup of the town was 100.00% White.

There were 18 households, out of which 11.1% had children under the age of 18 living with them, 61.1% were married couples living together, and 33.3% were non-families. 22.2% of all households were made up of individuals, and none had someone living alone who was 65 years of age or older. The average household size was 2.11 and the average family size was 2.50.

In the town, the population was spread out, with 18.4% under the age of 18, 10.5% from 18 to 24, 21.1% from 25 to 44, 39.5% from 45 to 64, and 10.5% who were 65 years of age or older. The median age was 44 years. For every 100 females, there were 153.3 males. For every 100 females age 18 and over, there were 158.3 males.

The median income for a household in the town was $38,125, and the median income for a family was $45,000. Males had a median income of $25,625 versus $0 for females. The per capita income for the town was $21,050. There were no families and 7.1% of the population living below the poverty line, including no under eighteens and none of those over 64.

Politics
The Town of Frenchboro cast 33 votes in the 2016 Presidential Election 23 for Republican candidate Donald Trump, 7 for Democratic candidate Hillary Clinton, 2 for Green Party candidate Jill Stein and 1 Undervote.

Buildings and structures
Great Duck Island Light, located on Great Duck Island, is in the town of Frenchboro and is listed on the National Register of Historic Places.

Education
Frenchboro Elementary School supports kindergarten through eighth grade.

References

External links 

Frenchboro from Islandport Press

Towns in Hancock County, Maine
Islands of Hancock County, Maine
Towns in Maine
Populated coastal places in Maine
Islands of Maine
Coastal islands of Maine